Alexander Prior (born 5 October 1992) is a British composer and conductor who studied at the Saint Petersburg Conservatory. He was Chief Conductor of the Edmonton Symphony Orchestra from 2017 to 2022.

Life and career
Prior was born in London to a British father and a Russian mother who was a descendant of Konstantin Stanislavski. Prior began composing at the age of eight and has written more than 40 works, including symphonies, concertos, two ballets, two operas, and a Requiem for the children of Beslan. At an early age, he began piano lessons. He later enrolled in the junior department of the Royal College of Music. At 13, he entered the Saint Petersburg Conservatory where, beginning in his third year, he studied composition with Boris Tishchenko and opera and symphonic conducting with Alexander Alexeev (a pupil of Hans Swarowsky). In 2009, at age 17, he graduated with distinction, with two masters degrees in symphonic and operatic conducting, and in composition from the St. Petersburg Conservatory.

Prior has collaborated with many leading orchestras and ensembles, including The BBC Singers, the Royal Philharmonic Orchestra, the New Opera Orchestra, the Northern Sinfonia, and the ensemble Endymion. Highlights include a performance of his Sonata for Cello and Piano at the Moscow Tchaikovsky Conservatory and a symphonic poem, Stalin's March, as part of the Arts Council-funded New Music Day with the City of London Sinfonia. Other performances include The Prince's Feast with Prior conducting the National Symphony Orchestra of London at the Barbican Centre and the premiere of Svyatogor's Quest by the Sitkovetsky Piano Trio at Wigmore Hall. In Autumn 2008, following performances in St. Petersburg, the Rossica Choir toured the UK, featuring Prior's choral cycle Sounds of the Homeland and parts of his All Night Vigil.

Prior's Piano Concerto No. 1 was premiered at the V International Piano Festival in St. Petersburg in September 2006. Prior was runner-up in the 2008 International Prokofiev Composers Competition – his Piano Concerto No. 2 Northern Dances was performed by the State Academic Symphony of St. Petersburg in the Great Philharmonic Hall. In 2006, Prior's ballet Mowgli (based on Rudyard Kipling's The Jungle Book) was commissioned by choreographers Natalia Kasatkina and Vladimir Vassilev of the Moscow State Classical Ballet. The official premiere took place at the Kremlin Theatre in Moscow in February 2008.

Prior made his UK conducting debut with The National Symphony Orchestra at the Barbican in March 2007. He also conducted the State Symphony Orchestra of St. Petersburg in a performance of his String Symphony No. 1 and in a concert in the St. Petersburg Philharmonic Hall entirely devoted to his own compositions.

In November 2008 he conducted a performance of Rimsky-Korsakov's The Tsar's Bride in St. Petersburg, followed by a performance of Tchaikovsky's The Nutcracker in January 2009.

In 2009, Prior received a commission from Channel 4 to compose a concerto featuring some of the world's most outstanding young musicians, as finally chosen by Prior, which included Zhang Xiaoming ("Jack") (age 10) on piano, Michael Province (age 13) on violin, Simone Porter (age 12) on violin, and Nathan Chan (age 15) on cello. The three-part series, culminating in a concert at Sage Gateshead, was broadcast in June 2009, with Prior conducting the Northern Sinfonia.

Prior was commissioned by the St. Petersburg Concert Society to write a choral symphony based on Nikolai Gogol's work "Nevsky Prospekt" and other stories such as "Diary of a Madman". Prior's Symphony No.4 "Gogol" was premiered on 19 December 2009 at the Smolniy Cathedral in St. Petersburg with Prior conducting the St. Petersburg State Symphony Orchestra.

On 8 January 2010, the Seattle Symphony appointed Prior as an Assistant to Guest Conductors, a specially created six-month fellowship, for the period from January through July 2010.

In Summer 2010. he was a conducting fellow at the Tanglewood Music Center.

In August 2011, he conducted the world premiere of his Triple Concerto, entitled "That which must forever remain unspoken", with the City Chamber Orchestra of Hong Kong.

In 2011, Prior was the principal conductor for the Northwest Mahler Festival in Seattle.

In December 2011, Prior was a conductor for the Royal Danish Ballet performing The Nutcracker at the Royal Danish Theatre in Copenhagen.

He was commissioned to compose Los Angeles Opera's new opera for families, Jonah and the Whale, which will have its world premiere in March 2012 at the Cathedral of Our Lady of the Angels, conducted by James Conlon.

Reviews
Prior has received some positive reviews for his recent concerto Velesslavitsa, both as a composer and a conductor.

"But Prior was the real star. In his fourth year at the St Petersburg Conservatoire, he is in essence a Russian composer, and it was no surprise that Velesslavitsa sounded like an exuberant apotheosis, in concerto-grosso form, of Mussorgsky, Rimsky-Korsakov and other Russian Romantics – the kind of over-the-top music a 16-year-old should be writing. At 47 minutes the structure could be tighter, but it has drama, colour and excitement in abundance.

And Prior the conductor is an absolute professional, clear in his gestures, authoritative in manner, supportive of his soloists. No longer a Wunderkind, he's well on the way to being a Wunder-adult."

"Prior certainly knows how to compose, and certainly has a bright future..."
The Times

Awards 
 2nd prize at the Leeds conducting competition at the age of 16
 International Prokofiev Composition Competition
 In Russia he was awarded the order of The Blue Cross, for his contribution to the national and international arts scene, and for his charitable work within music.

Selected compositions

"Horizons: An American Crescendo for Four Soloists and Orchestra" dedicated to John Adams.

Concertos
 3 Piano concertos St. Petersburg Dances of the North and No.3
 Concerto for 4 soloists and orchestra Velesslavitsa
 Triple Concerto for Piano, Violin and Cello "That which must forever remain unspoken"

Symphonies
 No.1 Karelian
 No.2
 No.3 "Northern"
 No.4 "Gogol"

Operas
 The Desert based on Alexander Pushkin's tales.

Ballets
 Mowgli

Choral
 All Night Vigil
 Sounds of the Homeland
 At the North for SATB Choir on Ivan Bunin's poetry

Piano Solo
 10 preludes
 Evenings on the Farm near Dikanka

References

External links
Alexander Prior's Official Website
 Gallafent, Alex, "Child prodigy composes ballet", The World program, PRI Radio, 19 June 2007
"UK teen conducts Moscow ballet", BBC News, Tuesday, 19 June 2007
Alex Prior on classicalx.com

1992 births
Living people
Child classical musicians
British male classical composers
British opera composers
Male opera composers
British ballet composers
English people of Russian descent
British classical composers
21st-century classical composers
21st-century British conductors (music)
British male conductors (music)
Musicians from London
21st-century British male musicians